A royal seal is a seal used by a monarch.

Royal seal may also refer to:

Great Seal of the Realm, United Kingdom
Great Seal of Scotland
Great Seal of Northern Ireland
Great Seal of Canada

See also
Great Seal, a seal used by a head of state
Imperial Seal (disambiguation)